Baghestan-e Abu ol Hayat (also Romanized as Bāghestān-e Abū ol Ḩayāt) is a village in Kuhmareh Rural District, Kuhmareh District, Kazerun County, Fars Province, Iran. At the 2006 census, its population was 19, in 4 families.

References 

Populated places in Kazerun County